The 2012 Asian Championship of Ski Mountaineering was the third edition of an Asian Championship of Ski Mountaineering, and the second official sanctioned by the International Ski Mountaineering Federation (ISMF),

The event was organized by the Korea Alpine Federation, and was held at the South Korean Yongpyong Ski Resort in the Gangwon Province from February 18 to 19, 2012.

Results 
Event was held on April February 19, 2012. It was only an individual race offered as at the 2007 edition. Like the European Championship of 2012 the Asian championship did not follow the previous edition in the typical biannual rhythm because the World Championship, which was originally planned for 2012, was moved to the year 2011.

List of the best 10 participants by gender:

References 

2012
Asian Ski Mountaineering Championship
Asian Championship of Ski Mountaineering
2012 in ski mountaineering